Doctors, Professors, Kings and Queens: The Big Ol' Box of New Orleans is a 2004 box set compilation gathering 85 songs representing the music of New Orleans from the 1920s to 2003. Represented on the album is a variety of musical genres, including jazz, R&B and blues, and a number of musicians, mingling noted artists such as Louis Armstrong, Fats Domino, Dr. John and the Neville Brothers with less renowned musicians.

Track listing

Disc One

Disc Two

Disc Three

Disc Four

References

External links
Review at popmatters.com

2004 compilation albums
Music of Louisiana
Blues compilation albums
Jazz compilation albums